James Graham Bentley (born 11 June 1976) is an English professional football manager and former player who played as a centre back. He is currently manager of EFL League Two club Rochdale.

Career
Bentley, who debuted for Telford United in 1997, moved to Morecambe in 2002. He played as a defender.

In June 2010, Bentley was appointed player-coach, having spent the previous season in a coaching role with the reserve team.

On 13 May 2011, Bentley was appointed the player-manager of Morecambe on a two-year contract, but since then he has concentrated on the managerial role and has not played a competitive match since taking on that post. He signed a two-year contract extension with the Shrimps on 10 October 2013. A further two-year contract extension was agreed with Morecambe on 29 August 2015. Ken McKenna also agreed the same deal with the League Two club. On 13 October 2017, Bentley and McKenna agreed further contract extensions until the end of the 2019–20 season.

During Morecambe's 1–2 defeat to Cheltenham on 17 December 2016, Bentley was sent off from the dugout, after reacting to Alex Kenyon's dismissal. He received a £750 fine with £250 costs and a two match touchline ban from the FA after a personal hearing. At the following home game, a 4–1 victory over Notts County, Morecambe fans held a 'bucket collection' and raised the £1,000.

After the departure of Paul Tisdale from Exeter City in June 2018, Bentley became the longest serving manager in the top four tiers of English football, until his resignation in October 2019 in order to become the new manager of AFC Fylde. Bentley was sacked by the National League North club sitting in fourth place, fourteen points off of top spot.

On 29 August 2022, Bentley was appointed manager of League Two's bottom club Rochdale on a two-year contract.

Managerial statistics

Honours
Individual
League Two Manager of the Month: August 2014, August 2016

References

External links

1976 births
Living people
Footballers from Liverpool
English footballers
Association football defenders
Manchester City F.C. players
Telford United F.C. players
Morecambe F.C. players
National League (English football) players
English Football League players
English football managers
Morecambe F.C. managers
AFC Fylde managers
Rochdale A.F.C. managers
English Football League managers
National League (English football) managers